Charlene Diane Dallas (born April 13, 1947) is a former beauty queen contestant who was Miss California for 1966, as well as first runner-up to Miss America for 1967.

Early life and education
Dallas is from Danville in Contra Costa County, California. She studied at California College of Arts and Crafts.

Pageantry career
In 1966, Dallas competed as Miss Contra Costa County for the Miss California competition. While she placed as first runner-up, the original winner Donna Danzer returned the title within an hour of winning, and Dallas was named the winner instead.

At the Miss America 1967 competition, hosted in September 1966, she won a talent award for playing piano and a swimsuit award. She finished first runner-up overall.

Acting career
She had a number of minor acting roles, including one as Laura Beige in the 1975 film Rancho Deluxe. She played Rita Lange In the "Dirge for a Dead Dachshund" episode of The Eddie Capra Mysteries in 1978, and had second billing in the 1989 film Criminal Act, playing Sharon Fields.

Filmography
Cops and Robbers (1973)
Rancho Deluxe (1975)
The Great Bank Hoax (1978)
Criminal Act (1989)

References

External links

1947 births
Living people
Miss America 1960s delegates
Miss America Preliminary Talent winners
Miss America Preliminary Swimsuit winners
20th-century American people